Ghazl El Mahalla Stadium is a multi-purpose stadium located in El Mahalla El Kubra, Egypt. It is used mainly for football and serves as the home stadium of Ghazl El Mahalla, but it also hosts Baladeyet El Mahalla and Said El Mahalla home matches. The stadium hosted three matches during the 1974 Africa Cup of Nations. The stadium has a seating capacity of 20,000.

External links
About the stadium - WeladElBalad

Football venues in Egypt
Multi-purpose stadiums in Egypt